"I Need a Girl (Part One)" is a single by American rapper P. Diddy featuring Usher and Loon from the album We Invented the Remix. In 2004, the song was featured on the Bad Boys compilation R&B Hits. Along with "I Need a Girl (Part Two)", P. Diddy achieved a rare occurrence by having two parts of a song become chart hits. Part one peaked at number two on the US Billboard Hot 100 and number one on the Billboard Hot Rap Tracks chart. It also charted on the UK Singles Chart at number four. The song was ranked number 15 on the Billboard Hot 100 year-end chart in 2002. The song contains a chord progression played on a Roland JV-1080 sound module, using a patch named "Flying Waltz".

Background
Combs admits that the lyrics in the third verse are about his ex-girlfriend Jennifer Lopez, along with his other ex relationships.

Music video
The music video features mainly Diddy and Usher singing at a house party filled with dancing guests, mostly women. Rappers Craig Mack, DJ Clue and Fabolous make cameo appearances.

Track listings

Charts

Weekly charts

Year-end charts

Certifications

Release history

References

2002 singles
Arista Records singles
Bad Boy Records singles
Contemporary R&B ballads
Music videos directed by Benny Boom
Sean Combs songs
Song recordings produced by Sean Combs
Songs written by Adonis Shropshire
Songs written by Loon (rapper)
Songs written by Mario Winans
Songs written by Sean Combs
Usher (musician) songs